Köln-Nippes is a passenger and freight railway station situated in Nippes, the northern border of the city of Cologne in western Germany. It is served by the S6 and S11 lines of the Rhine-Ruhr S-Bahn.

References

S6 (Rhine-Ruhr S-Bahn)
S11 (Rhine-Ruhr S-Bahn)
Railway stations in Cologne
Rhine-Ruhr S-Bahn stations
Nippes, Cologne
Railway stations in Germany opened in 1855